Pseudomonas brenneri is a Gram-negative, rod-shaped, fluorescent, motile bacterium with a single polar flagella isolated from natural mineral waters in France. Based on 16S rRNA analysis, P. brenneri falls within the P. fluorescens group.

References

External links
Type strain of Pseudomonas brenneri at BacDive -  the Bacterial Diversity Metadatabase

Pseudomonadales
Bacteria described in 2001